Nancy "Slim" Keith, Lady Keith (born Mary Raye Gross; July 15, 1917 – April 16, 1990) was an American socialite and fashion icon during the 1950s and 1960s, exemplifying the American jet set.

She and her friend Babe Paley were the thinly veiled inspiration for characters in Truman Capote's novel Answered Prayers. She is also credited with bringing Lauren Bacall to Hollywood's attention by showing her then-husband, producer Howard Hawks, a magazine cover with Bacall's picture on it.

Early life
Born Mary Raye Gross in Salinas, California (her mother changed her name to Nancy), by age 22, she had appeared on the cover of Harper's Bazaar. She was included on that celebrated fashion magazine's "best-dressed" list for years, and in 1946 won a Neiman Marcus Fashion Award (as Mrs. Leland Hayward). Nicknamed “Slim”, she was also dubbed the original "California Girl" because of her golden looks and athletic ability. She considered a career in opera, before deciding it was too demanding.

Personal life

Slim at the age of 16 left school and traveled to Death Valley. While staying at the Furnace Creek Inn and Ranch Resort, she met William Powell. Through Powell, she was introduced to William Randolph Hearst and his companion Marion Davies. She thus became a Hollywood socialite and was frequently seen at parties with Gary Cooper and Cary Grant. She was pursued romantically by Clark Gable, as well as by Ernest Hemingway. In 1938 she met Howard Hawks, the noted film director, who was immediately smitten with her and did everything he could to persuade her to marry him, despite the fact he was already married to Athole Shearer, the sister of actress Norma Shearer. Three years later, after his divorce from Athole, they were married. Hawks, however, was unable to remain faithful, and shortly after the birth of their daughter Kitty Hawks, Slim moved to Havana to stay with Ernest Hemingway. There in Cuba she also met the man who would be her second husband, the movie and theatrical producer Leland Hayward. Through Hayward, her step-granddaughter was Marin Hopper. In 1949, soon after divorcing their respective spouses, they married in New York and remained together for 10 years. Slim later wrote that Hayward had been the one love of her life even though he had left her for Pamela Churchill, who, like Slim, had gained much of her early celebrity as a socialite and by marriage. Slim's next and last husband was British banker Kenneth Keith, whom she left in 1972 after a 10-year marriage.

Keith banished Capote from her life when he used her as the unflattering model for the fictional Lady Coolbirth of his infamous and unfinished Answered Prayers. She never spoke to him again. This particular era is explored further in Melanie Benjamin's novel The Swans of Fifth Avenue.
According to Sally Bedell Smith in Reflected Glory, the model for Lady Coolbirth was Pamela Harriman, not Slim Keith.

Slim was also known for her iconic sense of style. With exceptional taste, Slim pursued an elegant, crisp style in all that she wore.

Death
The last years of her life were spent pursuing travel and quiet social activities in New York. An inveterate smoker, she died at age 72 of lung cancer at New York Hospital.

Fictional portrayals
Slim Keith was portrayed in the film Infamous (2006) by Hope Davis, and mentioned briefly in Rear Window (1954) as Slim Hayward. Her marriage to Howard Hawks was depicted in Tonya Walker's short story "Slim" in The Cunningham Short Story Anthology published by Willowdown Books. She was also depicted in Melanie Benjamin's book The Swans of Fifth Avenue (2016). The novel explores elements of Slim's colorful life, as well as her friendships with Babe Paley and Truman Capote. Although her remarkable sense of style is not a focus of the novel, much can be said about her contributions to classic, Americana dress. In a particularly revealing scene, Benjamin imagines Keith raising a glass to Babe and Truman. She recalls, "'A time before it was fashionable to tell the truth, and the world grew sordid from too much honesty.'"

References

Further reading

External links
 Divas - The Site

1917 births
1990 deaths
20th-century American women
American socialites
Keith of Castleacre
Deaths from lung cancer in New York (state)
Female models from California
People from Salinas, California
Spouses of life peers